Ennio is a given name. Notable people with the name include:

People

Academics
Ennio Candotti (b. 1942), Italy-born Brazilian physicist
Ennio de Giorgi (1928–1996), Italian mathematician
Ennio Quirino Visconti (1751–1818), Italian archaeologist

Clergy
Ennio Antonelli (b. 1936), Italian Cardinal of the Roman Catholic Church
Ennio Filonardi (1466–1549), Italian bishop and Cardinal of the Roman Catholic Church

Musicians
Ennio Bolognini (1893–1979), Argentina-born US musician 
Ennio Morricone (1928–2020), Italian composer
"Ennio", a 2021 documentary about his life

Performers
Ennio Balbo (1922–1989), Italian film actor
Enio Girolami (1935–2013), Italian film and television actor
Ennio Marchetto (b. 1960), Italian comedian

Others
Ennio Capasa (b. 1960), Italian fashion designer 
Ennio de Concini (1923–2008), Italian screenwriter and film director
Ennio Doris (b. 1940), Italian businessman 
Ennio Falco (b. 1968), Italian sports shooter
Ennio Flaiano (1910–1972), Italian screenwriter, playwright and author
Ennio Mattarelli (b. 1928), Italian sports shooter and Olympic Champion

Fictional characters
 "Ennio the Legend", also known as Spot, is a major supporting character in the computer game Tass Times in Tonetown

See also
 Ennius, the original Latin form of the name
 Ennius of East Anglia
 Einion, a Welsh form of the related Latin name Ennianus

Italian masculine given names